Cronicamente Inviável (English: Chronically Unfeasible) is a 2000 Brazilian film directed by Sérgio Bianchi.

Cast 
 Cecil Thiré as Luís
 Betty Gofman as Maria Alice
 Daniel Dantas as Carlos
 Dan Stulbach as Adam
 Umberto Magnani as Alfredo
 Dira Paes as Amanda
 Leonardo Vieira as Ceará
 Cosme dos Santos as Valdir
 Zezé Motta as Ada
 Zezeh Barbosa as Josilene
 Cláudia Mello as Motorista
 Rodrigo Santiago as Carioca
 Carmo Dalla Vecchia as himself
 João Acaiabe as Union Leader
 Patrick Alencar as Gabriel
 Roberto Bomtempo as Osvaldo, Josilene's boyfriend

Awards 
2000: Chicago International Film Festival
Best Feature (Nominee)

2001: Cinema Brazil Grand Prize
Best Picture (Nominee)

2001: São Paulo Association of Art Critics Awards
Best Film (won)

References

External links 
 

2000 films
2000s Portuguese-language films
Brazilian drama films
Best Picture APCA Award winners
2000 drama films